Lynne Olver (1958–2015) was a librarian and food historian, and the sole author of the Food Timeline website.

Personal life
Olver graduated from the University of Albany (SUNY). She was a librarian at the Morris County Library, New Jersey, and became its director in 2009.

The Food Timeline 
In 1999, Olver created The Food Timeline, a history website documenting culinary history, food history and recipes. The website has since become a major information source for culinary history. Almost all of the website's information comes from Lynne's personal library of over 2,000 books. Unlike many other food related websites, Olver gave citations to almost every statement on her site so that readers can verify her claims. Her research has been cited in peer-reviewed journals.

Following her death, the site was given to her family, who chose to remove social media accounts associated with the Food Timeline, but kept the website running in a state of dormancy. As such, the website is no longer maintained. The site's domain supposedly expires in 2025, but , the WHOIS database shows that is set to lapse in April 2022.

It has been widely reported that the Olver family is searching for a person or persons to maintain and possibly grow the website.

Virginia Tech
On November 11, 2020, the Olver family announced on the Food Timeline's Twitter account that they have selected the Virginia Tech's Food Studies Program to be the new curators for the Olver's website after reviewing over 80 other applicants. The Food Studies Program thanked Eater and writer Dayna Evans for bringing the Virginia Tech unit in contact with the Olver family. The Food Studies Program is headed by history professor Anna Zeide. In December 2020, Virginia Tech acquired the "website and accompanying physical library" and plans to "carry on Olver's legacy and create space for new research and student internship opportunities".

Audio interviews

Audio biography

References

External links 
 The Food Timeline website (archived 25 April 2020)

Food historians
1958 births
2015 deaths
University at Albany, SUNY alumni
American women historians
20th-century American historians
20th-century American women writers
21st-century American historians
21st-century American women writers
American librarians
American women librarians